Robert Birrell (6 October 1890 – 23 January 1956) was a Scottish professional footballer who played in the Scottish League for Heart of Midlothian, Cowdenbeath and St Mirren as a full back. He represented the Scottish League XI and was later one of the founders of Crossgates Primrose.

Personal life 
Birrell's younger brother Billy also became a footballer.

Career statistics

Honours
Cowdenbeath
 Scottish League Division Two (2): 1913–14, 1914–15
Eastern League (2): 1916–17, 1917–18

Heart of Midlothian 
East of Scotland Shield (1): 1920–21
Wilson Cup (2): 1918–19, 1919–20
Rosebery Charity Cup (2): 1918–19, 1920–21

Individual

Cowdenbeath Hall of Fame

References

1890 births
Scottish footballers
1956 deaths
Association football fullbacks
Footballers from Fife
Cowdenbeath F.C. players
Heart of Midlothian F.C. players
St Mirren F.C. players
Scottish Football League players
Scottish Football League representative players